Calomela bartoni (common name Acacia leaf beetle) is a beetle in the Chrysomelidae (leaf beetle) family, which is found in New South Wales and Victoria.

It was first described by Joseph Sugar Baly in 1856 as Australica bartoni, It was redescribed as a new species, Calomela nigricornis by Arthur Mills Lea  in 1903, but in 2006 Chris Reid judged these two species to be synonymous; the appropriate genus to be Calomela; and therefore, since Baly's description was prior to that of Lea the species name became Calomela bartoni.

Ecology 
Trevor Hawkeswood reports its larvae as feeding on Acacia decurrens.

References

External links
Canberra Nature Map: Calomela bartoni images

Beetles described in 1856
Taxa named by Joseph Sugar Baly
Chrysomelinae